Matt Lipsey is a British television and film director. His work includes King Bert Productions TV movies such as The Boy in the Dress and Billionaire Boy, Baby Cow Productions sitcoms Human Remains and Saxondale, and Hartswood Films series Supernova, The Cup and Jekyll. His first film, Caught in the Act, was released in 2008. He also directed all 14 episodes of the BBC Two sitcom Psychoville.

In 2005 he was presented with a British Academy Television Award for his work directing the second series of Little Britain.

In 2013, he directed Gangsta Granny.

In 2014, he directed the BBC television series Big School.

In 2017, he directed Sick Note starring Rupert Grint.

In 2019, he directed certain episodes of the comedy series Turn Up Charlie (directed alongside Tristram Shapeero), which was released on Netflix.

In 2020, he directed the comedy series Intelligence for Sky One starring David Schwimmer.

References

External links 
Matt Lipsey biography at Feel Films website

Year of birth missing (living people)
Living people
BAFTA winners (people)
British film directors
British television directors